Strážske ((rare)) is a small town and municipality in Michalovce District in the Kosice Region of eastern Slovakia. It is located in the most northern part of Michalovce District.

History
In historical records the town was first mentioned in 1337.

Geography
The municipality has a population of about 4,289 people. The town lies on the Laborec River.

Demographics
According to the 2001 census, the town had 4,474 inhabitants. 96.38% of inhabitants were Slovaks, 1.07% Roma, 0.87% Czechs, 0.45% Rusyns and 0.40% Ukrainian. The religious makeup was 63.59% Roman Catholics, 21.77% Greek Catholics, 7.58% people with no religious affiliation, 2.82% Orthodox and 1.41% Lutherans.

Government
The town has its own birth registry and police force.

Economy and facilities
Chemko is chemical plant which produced polychlorinated biphenyls PCBs) (until 1984) and contaminated a large part of East Slovakia, especially sediments of Laborec river and reservoir Zemplínska šírava.

The town has a number of food stores, a doctors' surgery, an outpatient facility for children and adolescents, and a resident dentist. It also has a Slovak commercial bank and insurance company.

Culture
The town has a public library, a disco bar called Broadway, an Ice-rink and a football pitch. It also has a DVD rental store and a town cinema. In the town park is an old manor-house and the oldest Lime-tree in Slovakia.

Transport
The town has a railway station and bus station.

Twin towns — sister cities
Strážske is twinned with:

  Nieporęt, Poland
  Drahanská vrchovina, Czech Republic
  Dolna Banya, Bulgaria

References

External links

http://www.strazske.sk/

Villages and municipalities in Michalovce District
Cities and towns in Slovakia